Brion Howard James (February 20, 1945 – August 7, 1999) was an American character actor. He portrayed Leon Kowalski in Blade Runner and appeared in Southern Comfort, 48 Hrs., Another 48 Hrs., Silverado, Tango & Cash, Red Heat, The Player, and The Fifth Element. James was frequently cast as an antagonist, appearing more frequently in lower-budget horror and action films and TV shows throughout the 1980s and 1990s. James appeared in more than 100 films before he died of a heart attack at the age of 54.

Early life and education
James was born in Redlands, California. He spent his early years in Beaumont, California, where his parents owned and operated a theater; James said, "My story is like Cinema Paradiso. Every night in my life since I was two years old... I ran movies". After graduating from high school in 1964, James attended San Diego State University as a Theater Arts major. Migrating to New York, James immersed himself in the theatre scene, taking on bit roles here and there.

Career
In 1975, James landed a small role in the made-for-television film, The Kansas City Massacre, playing John Dillinger gang member Homer Van Meter. Higher profile roles followed in 1976, with his casting in Nickelodeon and Harry and Walter Go to New York. James also appeared in the television miniseries Roots and popular 1970s shows such as Gunsmoke, The Incredible Hulk, Mork and Mindy, Chico and the Man, CHiPs.

James's career took a sudden upturn in the early 1980s with roles in Southern Comfort and 48 Hrs. (which were both directed by Walter Hill), but it was his performance as Leon Kowalski in the 1982 film Blade Runner that gave him his greatest, most lasting fame. James followed this up with roles in Enemy Mine, Flesh + Blood, A Breed Apart, Silverado, Armed and Dangerous, Red Heat, Steel Dawn, Red Scorpion, Tango & Cash, and Showdown. James had guest spots in the television shows Benson, Quincy, M.E., The A-Team, Little House on the Prairie, The Dukes of Hazzard, Matlock, Miami Vice, Hunter, along with the Hunter take off Sledge Hammer!, and Dynasty. In the 1990s, he appeared in Highlander: The Series, and as Sheriff Bowman in the Millennium season 2 episode "Luminary". He lent his voice to the character of Parasite in Superman: The Animated Series. In 1982, he was in the television film Hear No Evil as Billy Boy Burns.

James starred in the low-budget 1989 supernatural horror film The Horror Show (aka House III), where he played serial killer "Meat Cleaver Max" Jenke. In 1994, he played a grouchy sponsor who became a victim of the gruesome goings-on during a 1939 radio show in the film Radioland Murders. Near the end of his career, he appeared as the amiable General Munro in The Fifth Element (1997), a rare non-villainous role. Two months before his death, James reprised his role as Parasite in Superman 64, a video game based on Superman: The Animated Series.

Concerning his talent for playing villains in films, he stated in an interview in Fangoria magazine, "I consider myself a classical character actor like Lon Chaney, Wallace Beery, Charles Laughton. I always like to play bad guys. I'm real good at psychotic behavior."

Death
James died in 1999 after suffering a heart attack at his home in Malibu, California. He appeared in five feature films that were released posthumously. The last of these was Phoenix Point (2005).

The motion picture The King Is Alive (2000) was dedicated to him.

Filmography

Film

Television

Video games

Bibliography

References

Citations

Sources

External links

1945 births
1999 deaths
20th-century American male actors
Male actors from California
American male film actors
American male television actors
American male voice actors
People from Beaumont, California
United States Army soldiers
California National Guard personnel